Nightstalker is a 2002 American crime horror film written, directed, and produced by Chris Fisher about Richard Ramirez. It was nominated for two Fangoria Chainsaw Awards.

Cast
Bret Roberts as Night Stalker
Roselyn Sanchez as Gabriella Martinez 
Danny Trejo as Frank Luis
Brandi Emma as Adrianne Deloia
A. J. Buckley as Somo
Douglas Spain as Father Rodriguez
Lillian Hurst as Thelma Martinez
Chay Santini as Teenage Girl
Patricia Rae as Teenager's Mother

References

External links
 

2002 films
2002 horror films
American horror films
Biographical films about serial killers
Films about Richard Ramirez
Films directed by Chris Fisher
2002 directorial debut films
2000s English-language films
2000s American films